The WTA San Marino was a women's tennis tournament held in the City of San Marino, San Marino, from 1991 until 1993. The tournament was part of the WTA Tour and categorized as Tier V in 1991 and 1992 and Tier IV in 1993. The event was held in July and played on outdoor clay courts at the Centro Sportivo Tennis in 1991 and 1992 and at the Risparmio Tennis Club in 1993.

Past finals

Singles

Doubles

See also
 San Marino Open – men's tournament

References

External links 
 ITF tournament edition details (1991)
 ITF tournament edition details (1992)
 ITF tournament edition details (1993)

 
San Marino
San Marino
San Marino
Defunct tennis tournaments in Europe